Beppyo shrines
 is a Shinto shrine located in Hakata-ku, Fukuoka, Japan. Dedicated to Amaterasu and Susanoo, it is said to have been founded in 757. The Hakata Gion Yamakasa festival is centred on the shrine.

See also
List of Shinto shrines
Hakata Gion Yamakasa
Matsuri

References

External links
Official website: http://hakatanomiryoku.com/

Yokanavi.com

Shinto shrines in Fukuoka Prefecture
Buildings and structures in Fukuoka
Tourist attractions in Fukuoka
Culture articles needing translation from Japanese Wikipedia